William John Bankes (11 December 1786 – 15 April 1855) was an English politician, explorer, Egyptologist and adventurer.

The second, but first surviving, son of Henry Bankes MP, he was a member of the Bankes family of Dorset and he had Sir Charles Barry recase Kingston Lacy in stone as it is today.  He travelled extensively to the Near East and Egypt and made an extensive individual collection of Egyptian artefacts. His work on Egypt, though not acknowledged until the 21st century, is regarded as important. He was a good friend of Lord Byron, Samuel Rogers and Sir Charles Barry. He sat as Tory Member of Parliament (MP) for Truro in 1810, for Cambridge University from 1822 to 1826, for Marlborough (the UK parliamentary constituency that his maternal grandfather, William Woodley, for whom he was named, had held from 1780 to 1784) from 1829 to 1832, and finally for Dorset from 1832 to 1835.

Early life and education 
William Bankes was born in 1786 to Frances Woodley (1760–1823) and Henry Bankes, MP, of Kingston Lacy and Corfe Castle in Dorset. Frances was the eldest daughter of William Woodley (MP for Great Bedwin and Marlborough), Governor and Captain-General of the Leeward Islands (1766–1771 and 1791–1793), and his wife Frances Payne of St Kitts.  William's aunt was Maria Banks (Woodley) Riddell, a well-known poet, who was known to be the chief benefactor of the Scottish poet Robert Burns. William's sister Anne Frances Bankes married Edward Boscawen, 1st Earl of Falmouth in 1810.  In 1841, on the death of her husband, Lady Falmouth returned to reside at Kingston Lacy.  It was Lady Falmouth, in the absence of her brother, who was responsible for continuing the re-decoration of Kingston Lacy which had been commenced by her mother, Frances (Woodley) Bankes.

He was the second of five children and the eldest surviving son. He was educated at Westminster School and continued his studies at Trinity College, Cambridge where he received his BA in 1808 and his MA in 1811. Lord Byron, a fellow student at Trinity, became his lifelong friend. Bankes sometimes accompanied Byron in his European tours and was described by Lord Byron as the "father of all mischief".

Adventures and friendships

Bankes became interested in exploration and discovery, and had an evident passion for ancient Egypt and fine art. His extensive portfolio of notes, manuscripts and drawings produced and collected during his travels along the Nile with explorations in Egypt, Nubia, and the Near East with Giovanni Finati, whose memoirs he translated, have significant historical value and provide the only historical record of some inscriptions and monuments.

Bankes inherited Soughton Hall in Flintshire, Wales from his great uncle, and in 1835 inherited his family's home, Kingston Lacy. The mansion was home to Bankes for many years and still houses his vast collections of art and artefacts.

Sir Charles Barry, a renowned architect in his day, was also a long-term friend of Bankes. The two men met in 1819 at the temple of Rameses in Abu Simbel, where Bankes made drawings and arranged for the transport of the bilingual obelisk from Philae that may be seen in the gardens of Kingston Lacy today. Bankes had great respect for Barry's talents and Barry accomplished much of the building work on the Bankes's family properties over the years. Barry is known for his work on the Palace of Westminster, St. Peter's Church in Brighton, the Victoria Tower and the Westminster Bridge. His work was inspired by Italian Renaissance architecture and contributed to the improved design of Bankes' home, Kingston Lacy.

While travelling in Spain and Portugal during the Peninsular War, Bankes served as aide-de-camp to the Duke of Wellington, who later came to Bankes' rescue when he was on trial for partaking in a homosexual act. The Duke also celebrated Bankes' successes; he performed the ceremony at Kingston Lacy when the foundation was laid for one of Bankes' most notable discoveries, the Philae obelisk.

Bankes was an amateur architect, a careful epigrapher, and mastered the art of copying ancient inscriptions. He was very interested in Egypt and, though he was an opponent of Champollion, in deciphering ancient Egyptian hieroglyphs. Bankes dabbled in architecture and with the assistance of his friend Charles Barry, transformed Kingston Lacy by encasing the brick structure with stone. He collected numerous Spanish paintings, by Murillo and others, as well as artefacts from Ancient Egypt which are still housed at the house.

He was elected a Fellow of the Royal Society in March 1822.

One of his commissions for Kingston Lacy in 1853 was a set of 16 bronze tortoises from the sculptor Carlo Marochetti as supporters for four decorative marble urns; their design was based on one of Bankes' pet tortoises.  Four were stolen in 1992, but returned to the house in 2021.

Exile and death
Bankes was exiled from his home in England in 1841 due to homosexual activity which led him to flee, thus becoming an outlaw, seeking refuge after being caught in compromising circumstances with a guardsman in Green Park in London. At the time, sodomy was a grave crime in England and carried with it the death penalty – the last executions in England for sodomy had occurred only six years earlier, in 1835. To avoid seizure of his house by the crown, he signed Kingston Lacy over to his brother.

Even though he was unable to return to Kingston Lacy, he continued to collect from abroad, sending his collections to be displayed in his beloved home. He is believed to have secretly visited Kingston Lacy to admire his home and collections before his death in Venice. He was buried in the family vault in Wimborne Minster.

References

Citations

Bibliography
 R.J. Demarée with contributions by B. Leach and P.Usick. The Bankes Late Ramesside Papyri 2006. London: British Museum Press.
 Patricia Usick. The Adventures in Egypt and Nubia: The Travels of William John Bankes (1786–1855). 2002. London: British Museum Press.
 Anne Sebba. The Exiled Collector: William Bankes and the Making of an English Country House (2004) 
 Anthony Mitchell. Kingston Lacy (National Trust Guidebooks), 1994 
 Bankes of Kingston Lacy archive (ref: D/BKL), including the travel papers and correspondence of William John Bankes, c1800-1818, held at the Dorset History Centre
 Dorothy U. Seyler. The Obelisk and the Englishman: The Pioneering Discoveries of Egyptologist William Bankes. Amherst, NY: Prometheus Books, 2015. .

External links
 

William John
English explorers
1786 births
1855 deaths
People from Purbeck District
English LGBT politicians
Conservative Party (UK) MPs for English constituencies
Members of the Parliament of the United Kingdom for constituencies in Cornwall

Members of the Parliament of the United Kingdom for the University of Cambridge

UK MPs 1807–1812
UK MPs 1820–1826
UK MPs 1826–1830
UK MPs 1830–1831
UK MPs 1832–1835
Fellows of the Royal Society
English outlaws
English expatriates in Italy
LGBT members of the Parliament of the United Kingdom
18th-century LGBT people
19th-century British LGBT people
Abu Simbel